Kenneth Lorne Broderick (February 16, 1942 – March 13, 2016) was a Canadian professional ice hockey goaltender who played 27 games in the National Hockey League (NHL) for the Minnesota North Stars and Boston Bruins, and 73 games in the World Hockey Association (WHA) for the Edmonton Oilers and Quebec Nordiques. Broderick died after a short illness in 2016. He was the brother of the former professional hockey player Len Broderick.

Career statistics

Regular season and playoffs

International

References

External links
 

1942 births
2016 deaths
Boston Braves (AHL) players
Boston Bruins players
Binghamton Dusters players
Broome Dusters players
Canadian ice hockey goaltenders
Edmonton Oilers (WHA) players
Ice hockey players at the 1964 Winter Olympics
Ice hockey players at the 1968 Winter Olympics
Iowa Stars (CHL) players
Medalists at the 1968 Winter Olympics
Minnesota North Stars players
Olympic bronze medalists for Canada
Olympic ice hockey players of Canada
Olympic medalists in ice hockey
Quebec Nordiques (WHA) players
Rochester Americans players
San Diego Gulls (WHL) players
Ice hockey people from Toronto
Vancouver Canucks (WHL) players
UBC Thunderbirds ice hockey players